Heʻeia State Park is an 18.5 acre state park located near Kaneohe on the windward shore of the Hawaiian island of Oahu.  The park is located on Kaneohe Bay, between Heʻeia Fishpond and Heʻeia Kea small boat harbor.

References

External links
Heʻeia State Park on the Hawaii for Visitors website
Heʻeia State Park on the Hawaii State Park website
Heʻeia Learning Center website

State parks of Hawaii
Protected areas of Oahu
Protected areas established in 1977
1977 establishments in Hawaii